Orthosie  may refer to:

The Greek goddess of prosperity, one of the Horae
Orthosie (moon), a small moon of Jupiter

Children of Zeus